William Joseph "Joey" Dunlop  (25 February 1952 – 2 July 2000) was a Northern Irish motorcyclist from Ballymoney.

Career 
He won his third hat trick at the Isle of Man TT in 2000 and set his fastest lap on the course of 123.87 mph in the Senior race, which he finished third. In 2016 he was voted through Motorcycle News as the fifth greatest motorcycling icon ever, behind Valentino Rossi. His achievements include three hat-tricks at the Isle of Man TT meeting (1985, 1988 and 2000), where he won a record 26 races in total. A curve at the 26th milestone on the Isle of Man was named in his honour.

During his career he won the Ulster Grand Prix 24 times. In 1986, he won a fifth consecutive TT Formula One world title; initially based on one race at the Isle of Man TT after the loss of World Championship status from 1977-onwards and organised by the Auto-Cycle Union, the title was eventually expanded to take in more rounds in other countries.

He was awarded the MBE in 1986 for his services to the sport, and in 1996 he was awarded the OBE for his humanitarian work for children in Romanian orphanages, to which he had delivered clothing and food. Dunlop has featured in documentary films regarding his career: V Four Victory (1983), Joey – The Man Who Conquered the TT (2013) and Road (2014).

Charity work and recognition 

Dunlop helped orphans in the Balkans, driving a van loaded with supplies to orphanages in Romania, Albania and Bosnia-Herzegovina before the annual racing season began. In 1996, he received an OBE for his humanitarian work.

After Dunlop's death, the Joey Dunlop Foundation was initiated, a charity that provides appropriate accommodation for disabled visitors to the Isle of Man.

On 30 January 2015, Dunlop was voted Northern Ireland's greatest sports star by readers of the Belfast Telegraph newspaper.

Shipwreck 
On the night of 23 May 1985, Dunlop was travelling from Northern Ireland to the Isle of Man for the annual TT races by sea, on board the Tornamona, a former fishing boat. The vessel had departed from Strangford, County Down, with Dunlop, other riders, racing bikes and equipment on board. Strong currents into Strangford Lough pushed the Tornamona onto St Patrick's Rock, where her rudder broke off in a crevice. The boat sank and all 13 passengers and crew were rescued by the Portaferry Lifeboat. The bikes were later recovered by divers.

Personal life 
Dunlop married on 22 September 1972 at Ballymoney register office. He was the proprietor of a pub in Ballymoney, and was highly superstitious, always wearing a red T-shirt and his yellow crash helmet when racing. Dunlop was presented with the Freedom of the Borough by Ballymoney Council in 1993.

Death 
Dunlop died on 2 July 2000 in Tallinn, Estonia, while leading a 125cc race (he had already won the 750cc and 600cc events) on Pirita-Kose-Kloostrimetsa Circuit. He appeared to lose control of his bike in the wet conditions and died instantly on impact with trees. As a mark of respect, the Estonian government's official website was replaced with a tribute to Dunlop within hours of his death. Northern Ireland television carried live coverage of his funeral. Fifty thousand mourners, including bikers from all parts of Britain and Ireland and people from all backgrounds in Northern Ireland, attended the funeral procession to Garryduff Presbyterian church and his burial in the adjoining graveyard.

Legacy 
The most successful overall rider at the annual TT races is awarded the "Joey Dunlop Cup". A memorial statue was erected in his home town of Ballymoney. On the Isle of Man, a statue of Dunlop astride a Honda overlooks the Bungalow Bend at Snaefell and the 26th Milestone area of the TT course was named "Joey's". A memorial stone was installed at the crash site in Tallinn as well. Irish publishers The O'Brien Press produced a full-colour pictorial tribute to Dunlop following his death. Northern Ireland band Therapy? recorded a song in memory of Dunlop, called Joey; it appeared on the album Shameless, released in 2001.

Following his death, the Leisure Centre in his hometown of Ballymoney was renamed from the Riada Centre to the Joey Dunlop Leisure Centre. In 2001, the Joey Dunlop Memorial Garden was established in the Dunlop family's hometown, and in 2010 the tribute was extended to include the Robert Dunlop Memorial Garden to honour Joey's late brother, Robert Dunlop.
On 26 February 2022, a statue of William Dunlop, son of Robert and nephew of Joey, was added to the Memorial Garden. William died while racing at the Skerries 100 event in 2018.

Racing record

Complete TT record

Ulster Grand Prix: 24 victories

North West 200: 13 victories

Formula TT World Championship

World Grand Prix Championships

World Formula 750 Championship

Macau Grand Prix

Imola 200

World Superbikes (WSBK) 1988 

(Dunlop had 30 points accumulated and was lying 3rd in the championship up until the TT races, however he stopped competing in the championship and still managed to finish 13th in the final championship table.)

See also 
Robert Dunlop, Joey Dunlop's younger brother who died after a practice crash at the 2008 North West 200.
William Dunlop, Joey Dunlop's nephew and Robert's son. Michael's brother. Died after a practice crash at the 2018 Skerries 100.
Michael Dunlop, Joey Dunlop's nephew and Robert's son. William's brother.
List of people on stamps of Ireland
Road (2014 film)

References

External links 

The official Joey Dunlop website
Joey Dunlop Foundation
Tribute page on the TT website
University of Ulster news release
Billd's Joey stamps on Flickr
North West 200 Official Website
MFV Tornamona at Irish Wrecks Online

1952 births
2000 deaths
Isle of Man TT riders
Motorcycle racers who died while racing
British motorcycle racers
Motorcycle racers from Northern Ireland
Officers of the Order of the British Empire
People associated with Ulster University
Segrave Trophy recipients
Sport deaths in Estonia
People from Ballymoney
Superbike World Championship riders
Joey